2014 Asian Formula Renault Series (aka AFR Series) was the 15th Asian Formula Renault Series season since its creation by FRD in 2000. The series was based at the Zhuhai International Circuit, and four rounds of the season were held there. For 3 of them, AFR joined Pan Delta Racing Festival and for the season finale, it will be a support race of the Zhuhai 500 km Endurance Race. For the fifth round, at the Shanghai International Circuit, the series was the supporting race to the World Endurance Championship 2014 6 Hours of Shanghai  In addition, the series also went to the Sepang International Circuit in Malaysia for three-round race weekend.

The 2014 AFR Series saw drivers divided in to three categories: the International, Asian and Masters Classes. The International Class included drivers who were the front runners of previous AFR seasons or other national races. The Asian Class consisted of up-and-coming Asian drivers, while Masters Class was contested by experienced drivers who were 35 years old or above.

Teams and drivers

Race calendar and results

Notes

† - Supporting race to 2014 FIA World Endurance Championship Round in Shanghai.

References

External links
 

Asian Formula Renault Challenge
Asian Formula Renault Challenge
Asian Formula Renault